T. Tali  ( – 12 February 2020) was an Indian politician from Nagaland. He was a member of the Nagaland Legislative Assembly. He also served as a minister of the Government of Nagaland.

Biography
Tali was elected as a member of the Nagaland Legislative Assembly from Tuli in 1977, 1987, 1993, 1998 and 2003. He also served as a minister of the Government of Nagaland.

Tali died on 12 February 2020 at the age of 77.

References

1940s births
2020 deaths
Nagaland MLAs 1977–1982
Nagaland MLAs 1987–1988
Nagaland MLAs 1993–1998
Nagaland MLAs 1998–2003
Nagaland MLAs 2003–2008
Indian National Congress politicians from Nagaland
People from Mokokchung district